Isaac Camara (born 25 July 1993) is a Guinean footballer who currently plays as a defender for Besëlidhja Lezhë.

Career statistics

Club

Notes

References

1993 births
Living people
People from Kindia
Association football defenders
Guinean footballers
Besa Kavajë players
Besëlidhja Lezhë players
Kategoria e Parë players
Guinean expatriate footballers
Expatriate footballers in Albania
Guinean expatriate sportspeople in Albania